Nigel Winterburn (born 11 December 1963) is an English retired professional footballer, coach and current television personality for BT Sport.

He played primarily as a left back from 1981 to 2003. He is best known for his role alongside Tony Adams, Steve Bould, Martin Keown and Lee Dixon, forming a celebrated defensive line for Arsenal in the Premier League and European football during the 1990s. He also played in the top flight for West Ham United and in the Football League for Wimbledon as well as being contracted to Birmingham City and Oxford United. He earned two caps for England between 1989 and 1993.

During the 2008–09 season, Winterburn was briefly a part of the coaching staff at Blackburn Rovers under Paul Ince but was removed from his position by Ince's replacement Sam Allardyce.

Playing career

Birmingham City
Winterburn was born in Arley, Warwickshire. He became an apprentice at Birmingham City in May 1980 before turning professional in 1981, after he had played for Nuneaton schoolboys. Whilst at Birmingham City, he won an England Youth Cap but failed to make the first team, and after an unsuccessful trial at Oxford United he was signed, on a free transfer in August 1983, by Dave Bassett to join Wimbledon.

Wimbledon

Winterburn helped Wimbledon to promotion from Division Three to Division Two in 1983-84, and Division Two to Division One in 1985-86. In four seasons at the club, Winterburn missed only seven out of 172 league games for the club whilst being ever present in 1986-87, when Wimbledon finished sixth in the First Division. He was voted Player Of The Year for the club in four consecutive seasons, and earned England under-21 honours. In May 1987 he was transferred to Arsenal for £350.000. Manager George Graham was seeking a long-term replacement for Kenny Sansom.

Arsenal
Winterburn began his Arsenal career at right-back, an emergency measure employed by Graham after he'd been unsuccessful in finding a worthwhile replacement for Viv Anderson. Winterburn made his Arsenal league debut as a substitute at Highbury against Southampton on 21 November 1987, and on the remainder of that season he played in 17 league games.

Though heavily left-footed, Winterburn settled into the right back role as best he could and became quickly involved in two controversial incidents of his first season. First, he was seen to openly goad Brian McClair after the Manchester United striker had missed a late penalty in an FA Cup tie 20 February 1988 at Highbury. The second incident came in the League Cup final later that same season. Despite having fallen behind in the early stages, Arsenal, the holders, were leading Luton Town 2–1 at Wembley with less than quarter of an hour to go when David Rocastle got a penalty. Arsenal were awarded a penalty. Michael Thomas had been Arsenal's designated penalty taker all season but after spot-kick failures from Thomas and two subsequent successors, it was Winterburn - who'd never taken a penalty for Arsenal before - who collected the ball up to take the kick. He put the kick low and strong to the right hand corner as he viewed it, but Luton goalkeeper Andy Dibble guessed correctly and pushed the ball round the post. A newly inspired Luton then scored twice in the final ten minutes and won the final 3–2. 

Sansom, demoted to reserve team football, left Arsenal for Newcastle United in December 1988 and Winterburn settled into his more familiar left back role as a result, staying in it for more than a decade. He and fellow full back Lee Dixon flanked two superb central defenders in captain Tony Adams and veteran David O'Leary, joined during the 1989 season by Steve Bould. Often the manager would play all five of them as Arsenal took holders Liverpool to a last-game showdown at Anfield for the First Division title, which would have been Arsenal's first title since the Double year of 1971. Arsenal's situation meant they needed to win by at least two clear goals to clinch the championship. Winterburn's free kick set up a first for Alan Smith shortly after half time, but the second looked as though it would elude them until Thomas scored in injury time. This victory was the culmination of the film Fever Pitch.

In the penultimate game, a 2–2 draw at home to Wimbledon, 17 May 1989, Winterburn scored perhaps the finest goal of his career, driving the ball diagonally into the far, top corner from fully 25 yards with his little-used right foot. Given both points and goal difference were identical (Arsenal winning the league on more goals scored) every single goal Arsenal scored that campaign eventually proved decisive in winning the league, but had Arsenal lost that day then the Anfield game would have been irrelevant as the title would have already been lost.

Winterburn made his England debut later the same year, 15 November 1989, coming on as a substitute in a 0–0 draw against Italy. Though many media outlets and Winterburn's own club manager regularly extolled his virtues as an England left back, the national coach, Bobby Robson, had him as no higher than third in the pecking order at left back. Stuart Pearce was going to the 1990 World Cup as first choice, with Tony Dorigo as back-up. Only injury to either would see a way open for Winterburn, and that didn't happen; however, he did earn appearances for the B team.

Arsenal ended 1990 trophyless, but went on to win the league title again the next year, with only one loss. During a 1–0 victory away at Manchester United, there was a mass brawl that was started by a Winterburn tackle on Denis Irwin. Winterburn was eventually booked, and subsequently fined two weeks wages (along with 3 teammates and the manager, George Graham), but despite the two-point deduction - one more than Manchester United as Arsenal had been involved in a similar brawl against Norwich City in 1989 - Arsenal went on to win the league comfortably. 

Two years later, Winterburn was in the Arsenal team which won both cup competitions and thus completed his domestic set of medals. Arsenal defeated Sheffield Wednesday 2–1 in both the League Cup and FA Cup finals, the latter in a replay.

Winterburn's form earned him a brief England recall by Graham Taylor who included him in a squad for a mini-tournament in the U.S. during which England lost 2–0 to the United States. Winterburn came on as a sub for Manchester United winger Lee Sharpe in the final match of the contest against Germany. This was the last time he played for England.

In 1994, Arsenal beat Italian side Parma's 1–0, to win the European Cup Winners Cup, Arsenal's first success continentally for a quarter of a century. They would not be so successful the following year as they reached the final again but were beaten 2-1 by Real Zaragoza.

Arsène Wenger arrived at Arsenal at the end of 1996 and instilled new self-awareness and dietary habits into the Arsenal squad. This allowed the ageing defence (Adams was the youngest at 30 years of age; Martin Keown had also arrived to account for O'Leary's retirement after the 1993 FA Cup success) to thrive in and prolong the latter years of their careers. Arsenal won the "double" of Premiership and FA Cup in 1998. During the league campaign, in September 1997, as against Wimbledon in 1989, Winterburn again scored a vital goal from over 25 yards out driven diagonally into the far, top corner, this time with his favoured left foot. The 89th-minute winner, in a 3-2 Arsenal victory against Chelsea away at Stamford Bridge, moved Arsenal up to 2nd in the table. Winterburn was called up by caretaker manager Howard Wilkinson for the England squad in a friendly against France in 1999 but he was the odd one out from Wilkinson's first XI – Seaman, Adams, Keown and Dixon all started but Winterburn lost out to Graeme Le Saux for the left back slot and stayed on the bench for the 2–0 defeat.

In 1999–2000, Arsenal again failed to progress beyond the group stages of the Champions League, and therefore entered the UEFA Cup at the third round, where they were drawn against Nantes. During the first leg, which Arsenal won 3–0, Winterburn again scored with a drive into the far, top corner, though this time only from just outside the box. Arsenal went on to reach the UEFA Cup final but Winterburn had been forced out of the team by the Brazilian left back Sylvinho, although he in turn was displaced by the fledgling Ashley Cole within another 12 months.

West Ham United
Winterburn joined West Ham United in June 2000 for a fee of £250,000 after 429 League appearances and eight goals for Arsenal. He played 94 games in all competitions for West Ham, scoring one goal in a 1–0 away win against Leeds United on 18 November 2000. He retired in 2003, his last game coming on 2 February 2003 against Liverpool.

International career
Winterburn's full debut for England came on 15 November 1989 against Italy. He made his second and final appearance for the senior national side nearly four years later on 19 June 1993 against Germany. The regular England left-back at this stage was Stuart Pearce.

Coaching career
On 14 July 2008, Winterburn joined Paul Ince's backroom staff at Blackburn Rovers as defensive coach. Following the dismissal of Ince in December 2008, Winterburn was deemed surplus to requirements at Ewood Park. New manager Sam Allardyce stated, "I spoke to Nigel Winterburn today to say that, from my point of view, in terms of specialist defensive coaching, I think I can look after that area myself now."

Media career
In 2013, Winterburn became a pundit for BT Sport for the start of their football coverage. He regularly appears on the programme BT Sport Score.

Honours
Arsenal
Football League First Division: 1988–89, 1990–91
Premier League: 1997–98
FA Cup: 1992–93, 1997–98
Football League Cup: 1992–93
Football League Centenary Trophy: 1988
FA Charity Shield: 1991 (shared), 1998, 1999
European Cup Winners' Cup: 1993–94

References

External links

Nigel Winterburn League stats at World-Soccer

1963 births
Living people
English footballers
England international footballers
England B international footballers
England under-21 international footballers
Birmingham City F.C. players
Oxford United F.C. players
Wimbledon F.C. players
Arsenal F.C. players
West Ham United F.C. players
Premier League players
English Football League players
Blackburn Rovers F.C. non-playing staff
Association football defenders
Association football coaches
FA Cup Final players